Vaartha is a Telugu newspaper headquartered in Hyderabad, India. Vaartha means "news" in Telugu.

History 
Vaartha was launched in 1996 with A.B.K Prasad as its first editor. It claimed to be the first Telugu daily in Telangana and Andhra Pradesh to use Information Technology,  allowing it to publish news that broke at as late as 4 a.m. Vaartha was initially popular, competing with Eenadu and Udayam. It now has a smaller circulation than Eenadu, Sakshi or Andhra Jyothy. Vaartha is produced by A.G.A Publications, which is owned by Gireesh Kumar Sanghi's Hyderabad-based Sanghi Group.

References

External links 
 http://www.vaartha.com/

Telugu-language newspapers
Newspapers published in Hyderabad
Daily newspapers published in India
Publications established in 1966
1966 establishments in Andhra Pradesh